Mills Valley may refer to:

 Mills Valley (Victoria Land, Antarctica)
 Mills Valley (Juab County) in Utah